Ian Noel Ridley Shield  (24 December 1914 — 22 February 2005) was an English first-class cricketer and British Army officer.

Shield was born in December 1914 at Ayot St Lawrence, Hertfordshire. He was educated at Rugby School, before matriculating to Oriel College, Oxford. A club cricketer for the Hampshire Hogs, he took 495 wickets for the club over a 20-year period. His performances at club level bought him to the attention of Hampshire, with him making his first-class debut for the county against Essex at Southampton in the 1939 County Championship. He made three further appearances that season, against Somerset, Glamorgan and Sussex. Although effective as a fast-medium bowler, he was unable to carry that through into first-class cricket, taking just 4 wickets at an average of 68.50, with best figures of 2 for 91. The start of the Second World War in September 1939 bought the cricket season to a premature end. Shield served in the war, being commissioned as a second lieutenant into the Royal Artillery in October 1940 and ended the war as a temporary captain. Following the war, he was made an MBE in January 1946. Shield died at Petersfield in February 2005.

External links

External links

1914 births
2005 deaths
People from Ayot St Lawrence
People educated at Rugby School
Alumni of Oriel College, Oxford
English cricketers
Hampshire cricketers
British Army personnel of World War II
Royal Artillery officers
Members of the Order of the British Empire